Cherntsovo is a rural locality (a village) in Argunovskoye Rural Settlement, Nikolsky District, Vologda Oblast, Russia. The population was 138 as of 2002.

Geography 
Cherntsovo is located 50 km northwest of Nikolsk (the district's administrative centre) by road. Syrkovo is the nearest rural locality.

References 

Rural localities in Nikolsky District, Vologda Oblast